Real-time control system may refer to:

 Real-time Control System (RCS), a reference model architecture, suitable for many software-intensive, real-time control problem domains
 Real-time Control System Software, a software system developed by NIST based on the Real-time Control System Reference Model Architecture
 4D-RCS Reference Model Architecture, an RCS application in the vehicle domain
 ISAM Framework, an RCS application in the manufacturing domain
 NASA/NBS Standard Reference Model for Telerobot Control Systems Architecture (NASREM), an RCS application in the space domain
 Control engineering, an engineering field focusing on digital control systems and real-time systems
 Embedded system, a computer system with a dedicated function within a larger mechanical or electrical system

See also 
 RCS (disambiguation)